Iotti is a surname. Notable people with the surname include:

 Bruno Demetrio Iotti (born 1987), Brazilian midfielder
 Ilario Iotti (born 1995), Italian footballer
 Luca Iotti (born 1995), Italian footballer
 Nilde Iotti (1920–1999), Italian politician

See also
 Lotti